The Cost of Living is the "full-length demo" from Vermont's The Static Age. It was initially self-released via the band's Primary Records before being re-released through Red Dawn Records.

Track listing
 "The Blackout" – 4:17
 "Augustine" – 4:16
 "Madeline" – 4:46
 "Glitter" – 4:35
 "Mother Mercy" – 5:31
 "The Scream" – 4:50
 "Porcelain" – 4:56
 "The Echoes Upstairs" – 5:25

Personnel 

 Andrew Paley – Vocals, Guitar
 Marie Whiteford – Keyboards
 Adam Meilleur – Bass
 Bobby Hackney – Drums

References 

The Static Age albums
2002 debut albums